Israel (Yisrael) Carmi (born Israel Weinman), born 1917 (exact date unknown), died 20 January 2008, was the founder of the Tilhas Tizig Gesheften (TTG Brigade).

Life

Carmi was born in Danzig (now Gdańsk) sometime in 1917. At the age of 17 he immigrated to Israel, changing his surname from Weinman to Carmi. Carmi worked at a farming kibbutz in the area of Givat HaShlosha in central Israel. At the age of 19 (1936) Carmi was recruited into the Haganah (anglicised Hebrew: "The Defense"), and in the winter of 1936 Carmi volunteered for the Palestine Police Force on orders from Haganah. During the 1936–1939 Arab revolt in Palestine, Carmi fought whilst outnumbered by the revolting Arabs who tried to overrun Kfar Yehezkel, and in 1938 at the age of 21 Carmi was selected for the Special Night Squads, receiving the Colonial Police Medal of Valor for his duties.

In 1939 at the end of the Arab Revolt, Carmi returned to Givat HaShlosha and married Tonka, promising to stay on the farm and grow oranges and melons. However this changed with the issuance of the White Paper of 1939. Carmi joined the PUSH (Haganah unit), whose goal was to 'prevent the British from arresting the underground leaders and messing up covert training grounds.

When World War II broke out Carmi joined the Buffs (Royal East Kent Regiment) under orders from Haganah and became the rank of sergeant. During the summer of 1942 Carmi was stationed in Sinia where he stole British arms for future use. Carmi also served with the SIG Jewish Commando in North Africa (see Sugarman 'The Jewish Commandos of the SIG' in 'Fighting Back', London, Valentine Mitchell, 2017). Then during July 1943 Carmi was in Benghazi as part of the 2nd Battalion of the Palestine Regiment, a supporting unit of the Jewish Brigade. Carmi caused mutiny in the 2nd Battalion after the commander ripped down the Israeli flag Carmi had raised instead of a British flag.

In 1944 Carmi joined the Jewish Brigade. Around October 1944 Carmi travelled to Alexandria and then directly to Italy where he smuggled two Haganah operatives as British soldiers, their mission was to determine the truthfulness of the gas chamber rumors. From here Carmi travelled north to a base established in Fiuggi. After this Carmi and operatives left Italy for Germany, on the way there was an incident in which the group attacked wehrmacht POWS and as a result the British ordered them not to enter Germany and to stay in Tarvisio.

In June 1945 Carmi and operatives left the encampment in Tarvisio to visit the Mauthausen Concentration Camp. Carmi asked to be transferred to the intelligence units, where he gathered information regarding the whereabouts of Nazis. Together with Australian born Robert Grossman, Carmi travelled back to Italy, this time to Treviso, and gathered information from locals around the area, including touting for information. Treviso was considered the perfect location because the SS stayed throughout the war and the local train station was used in connection with the deportation of Italian Jews, and the area was also full of refugees and recovering Wehrmacht soldiers. Here Carmi got information regarding a high-ranking Gestapo officer in charge of confiscation of the property of Italian Jews. In turn Carmi went to the home of the Gestapo officer disguised as a British officer and searched the home, finding bags of jewellery, guns, and cash. Upon threats to kill him, the Gestapo officer offered information providing the addresses and other personal information of other SS or Gestapo officers - receiving 18 pages of names. Carmi gave the list of minor officers to the Allied Intelligence Bureau (AIB), but kept the major officers list. Carmi then organised a group of fellow Jewish Brigade officers to track and kill those whose guilt was "definitively established" by evidence. Members of the group included Meir Zorea, Haim Laskov, Abram Silberstein, Marcel Tobias, and Orly Givon. Some offered membership to the group due to the extrajudicial nature of their actions. The group began killing officers from the list, typically stating "in the name of the Jewish people, I sentence you to death." before carrying out a quick field trial, later the officers were killed by strangulation, and two SS officers were pushed over a mountain ledge.

See also
Tilhas Tizig Gesheften
Inglourious Basterds
Tscherim Soobzokov
Jewish Brigade
Hashomer

References

Bibliography

External links
 Hagana web site

1917 births
2008 deaths
Israeli people of Polish-Jewish descent
Israeli soldiers
Polish emigrants to Mandatory Palestine
Haganah members
Mandatory Palestine military personnel of World War II
Jewish Brigade personnel
Buffs (Royal East Kent Regiment) soldiers
Palestine Regiment officers
Military personnel from Gdańsk
Nazi hunters
British Army personnel of World War II